The 1987 Big East baseball tournament was held at Muzzy Field in Bristol, Connecticut. As a result, Seton Hall earned the Big East Conference's automatic bid to the 1987 NCAA Division I baseball tournament.

Format and seeding 
The 1987 Big East baseball tournament was a 4 team double elimination tournament. The top two teams from each division, based on conference winning percentage only, earned berths in the tournament. Each division winner played the opposite division's runner up in the first round.

Tournament

All-Tournament Team 
The following players were named to the All-Tournament team.

Jack Kaiser Award 
Mo Vaughn was the winner of the 1987 Jack Kaiser Award. Vaughn was a designated hitter for Seton Hall.

References 

Tournament
Big East Conference Baseball Tournament
Big East Conference baseball tournament
Big East Conference baseball tournament
College baseball tournaments in Connecticut
Bristol, Connecticut
Sports competitions in Hartford County, Connecticut